Rovensky ( or ), Rovenskaya, or Rovenskoye may refer to:
Rovensky (surname)
Rovensky District, name of several districts in Russia
Rovensky (rural locality) (Rovenskaya, Rovenskoye), name of several rural localities in Russia
Rovensky Park, a historic park in Newport, Rhode Island, United States